Lakendrick Tridel Clancy (born September 17, 1978) is a former professional American football defensive tackle in the National Football League (NFL). He was drafted by the Pittsburgh Steelers in 2000, having also played for the New York Giants, Arizona Cardinals and New Orleans Saints. He played college football at the University of Mississippi.

Early and college career
Born in Tuscaloosa, Alabama, Clancy attended Holt High School before playing college football at East Central Community College in Decatur, Mississippi, and then at Ole Miss. As a senior in 1999, he was team captain and a third-team All-American selection by The Sporting News and The Football News

Professional career
Clancy was drafted by the Steelers in the third round in 2000 and played for them for four years. After his time with the Steelers, he signed with the Giants, where he played for one year, followed by a year with the Cardinals. He then signed with the Saints in 2007. In 2009, he began the season as a projected starter, but injured his knee in the opening game, thus played in only 2 games, ending up on the injured reserve list while the team won Super Bowl XLIV. He was an unrestricted free agent after the 2009 season, but the Saints re-signed him on August 30, 2010. He was released 5 days later.

References

1978 births
Living people
Sportspeople from Tuscaloosa, Alabama
New Orleans Saints players
Arizona Cardinals players
American football defensive tackles
New York Giants players
Pittsburgh Steelers players
Ole Miss Rebels football players
East Central Warriors football players
East Central Community College alumni